Benjamin Epstein was national director of the Anti-Defamation League from 1948 through 1978. He was ADL vice president from 1978 through 1983.

Career 

Epstein taught at the University of Pennsylvania and as a high school teacher in Coatesville for several years.

Epstein joined the ADL in 1939 as directory of its Foreign Languages Department. Epstein later became the Eastern regional director. Epstein was national director of the Anti-Defamation League from 1948 through 1978. He was ADL vice president from 1978 through 1983. He replaced Richard Gutstadt, the national director from 1931 to 1948. In ADL leadership, Epstein presided over an aggressive strategic shift. Whereas Gustadt used more circumspect media relations and "fact-finding" missions regarding Nazi groups, Epstein conducted public and oppositional media campaigns and led infiltration and document-stealing missions against Nazi groups. For instance, Epstein's colleague and ADL attorney Arnold Forster developed a relationship with gossip columnist Walter Winchell, whom Forster fed embarrassing tidbits regarding antisemites.

In 1939, the ADL was informed of a translation of Adolf Hitler's Mein Kampf being performed in Chicago, Illinois. Epstein went to investigate, and he learned that the translation was commissioned by then-journalist, later a California senator, Alan Cranston. Cranston had been shocked that the available English translations of Mein Kampf left out the worst of Hitler's antisemitism and militancy. To fix this, Cranston wished to publish a translation highlighting the alarming aspects of Hitler's work. Epstein and Cranston co-founded Noram Publishing to publish the 32-page tabloid edition of Mein Kampf in 1939.

In 1960, Epstein discussed Catholic-Jewish relations with Pope John XXIII. He met with Pope Paul VI in 1971 and 1976.

Epstein marched alongside Martin Luther King at Selma, Alabama.

Personal life 
Epstein was born in Brooklyn and raised in Coatesville, Pennsylvania. He attended Dickinson College in Pennsylvania as an undergraduate, the University of Pennsylvania for a master's degree. He received an honorary Doctor of Human Letters degree from Dickinson College and an honorary Doctor of  Laws from Talladega College in Alabama. In 1934, Epstein traveled to Germany for a history fellowship with the University of Berlin. This brush with Nazism influenced his later work against prejudice and discrimination.

At time of his death in 1983, Epstein was survived by his wife Ethel, his children David and Ellen, and five grandchildren.

References 

Anti-Defamation League members
1983 deaths